William Lawrence McDonald (November 5, 1916 – February 7, 1994) was an American professional basketball player. He played for the Sheboygan Red Skins, Chicago American Gears, and Oshkosh All-Stars in the National Basketball League and averaged 4.1 points per game. In 1942–43 he won the NBL championship while playing for the Red Skins.

References

1916 births
1994 deaths
American men's basketball players
Basketball players from Illinois
Chicago American Gears players
Forwards (basketball)
Guards (basketball)
Marquette Golden Eagles men's basketball players
Oshkosh All-Stars players
People from Spring Valley, Illinois
Sheboygan Red Skins players